McCormick is an unincorporated community off Washington State Route 6 in Lewis County, in the U.S. state of Washington. 
The town is west of Pe Ell and 1.8 miles east of the extinct town of Walville, Washington and the Pacific County line. The Willapa Hills Trail bisects the area.

History
The town was built in 1897 around a mill for the McCormick Lumber Company, which began operations the following year. A post office, named after the mill's owner, Harry W. McCormick, was established around that time  and it remained in operation until 1929.

The mill would be rebuilt after it suffered a near-total loss in 1909. It closed in 1927 as lumber production at the plant had become idle. The town began to be demolished, with materials salvaged by a new owner of the company. A tuberculosis sanitorium was opened in 1935 and closed in 1941.

Considered a ghost town afterwards despite continual habitation, most of the property would be bought out beginning in 1954 by George Fraser, a retired tailor from Centralia.

Notes

References

Populated places in Lewis County, Washington
Unincorporated communities in Lewis County, Washington
Unincorporated communities in Washington (state)